Young Americans is the ninth studio album by English musician David Bowie, released on 7March 1975 through RCA Records. The album marked a departure from the glam rock style of Bowie's previous albums, showcasing his interest in soul and R&B. Commentators have described the record as blue-eyed soul, although Bowie himself labelled the album's sound "plastic soul". Initial recording sessions took place following the first leg of his Diamond Dogs Tour in August 1974 at Sigma Sound Studios in Philadelphia with producer Tony Visconti and a variety of musicians, including guitarist Carlos Alomar, who would become one of Bowie's most frequent collaborators. Backing vocalists included singer Ava Cherry, Alomar's wife Robin Clark and then-unknown singer Luther Vandross. After the initial sessions, the tour continued, with the setlist and design changed due to the influence of the new material recorded. This portion of the tour has been labeled the Soul tour.

At the end of the tour, sessions continued at the Record Plant in New York City. After becoming friends with former Beatle John Lennon, the two collaborated on a session in January 1975 at Electric Lady Studios, with Harry Maslin producing. With Alomar, they recorded "Fame" and a cover of Lennon's Beatles song "Across the Universe". Throughout the sessions, many outtakes were recorded and the record went through numerous working titles. The cover artwork is a back-lit photograph of Bowie taken by Eric Stephen Jacobs.

Upon its release, Young Americans was very successful in the US, reaching the top 10 on the Billboard Top LPs & Tape chart, with the single "Fame" becoming Bowie's first number one hit. It received mixed reviews from music critics and continues to receive mixed reviews. Bowie himself had mixed feelings about the album, although his biographers consider it one of his most influential records, noting him as among the first white musicians of the era to overtly engage with black musical styles. The album has since been reissued multiple times and was remastered in 2016 as part of the Who Can I Be Now? (1974–1976) box set.

Background and development
David Bowie's eighth studio album Diamond Dogs (1974) was his final album in the glam rock genre, which biographer David Buckley commented: "In the sort of move which would come to define his career, Bowie jumped the glam-rock ship just in time, before it drifted into a blank parody of itself." Despite being mostly glam rock, the album contained two songs, "Rock 'n' Roll with Me" and "1984", that exhibit elements of funk and soul, which Bowie embraced for Young Americans. Diamond Dogs was also a milestone in Bowie's career as it reunited him with his former producer Tony Visconti, who provided string arrangements and helped mix the album at his own studio in London. Visconti co-produced much of Bowie's work for the rest of the decade.

In early 1974, Bowie wrote the soul song "Take It in Right" as a single for Scottish singer Lulu. Although recording never came to fruition, while producing the session in New York City, he met funk guitarist Carlos Alomar, who would become Bowie's guide into black American music and, for the next 14 years, act as Bowie's bandleader. Before they met, Alomar was a session musician at the Apollo Theater, playing with the likes of James Brown, Chuck Berry and Wilson Pickett. Biographer Nicholas Pegg writes that ten years prior, one of Bowie's favourite records was Brown's Live at the Apollo (1963), so meeting a musician who played at the Apollo was a dream come true for Bowie. Although Alomar had never heard of Bowie when they met, they immediately connected and formed a working relationship that would last almost 15 years.

Towards the end of the first leg of his Diamond Dogs Tour in July 1974, Bowie resided at the Tower Theater in Upper Darby, Pennsylvania, where he recorded the live album David Live (1974). During his stay, he visited Sigma Sound Studios in Philadelphia to work on recordings for American musician Ava Cherry, who he allegedly had an affair with at the time. Sigma was the favorite studios of writer-producer duo Kenneth Gamble and Leon Huff, who co-founded Philadelphia International Records, the home of many well-known black American musicians. The studio was as central to the “Philly Sound” as Hitsville USA was to Motown. Following the end of the first leg of the tour, Bowie returned to New York City to mix David Live, where he requested a list of black albums to hear in preparation for his return to Sigma Sound.

Recording

For the backing band, Bowie wanted to hire MFSB (an acronym for "Mother Father Sister Brother"), a rhythm group of over 30 session musicians that resided at Sigma Sound. With the exception of percussionist Larry Washington, all members were unavailable, so Bowie traveled to New York City for further recruitment. Pianist Mike Garson, saxophonist David Sanborn and percussionist Pablo Rosario were retained from the Diamond Dogs Tour, while guitarist Earl Slick was replaced by Alomar. At Alomar's suggestion, Bowie hired former drummer of Sly and the Family Stone, Andy Newmark to replace Tony Newman and bassist Willie Weeks of the Isley Brothers to replace Herbie Flowers. When Bowie informed Visconti in London of Weeks' involvement, Visconti left for New York immediately, saying: "I'm a bass player myself, and [Weeks] was my idol". Cherry, Alomar's wife Robin Clark and then-unknown singer Luther Vandross performed backing vocals for the sessions.

Philadelphia sessions
Demo work began at Sigma Sound on 8August 1974, but official work commenced three days later upon Visconti's arrival. Before Philadelphia, Bowie had spent most of his recording career in Britain, where recording methods were different from those in the States. At Olympic and Trident Studios in Britain, engineers applied equalisers and reverb as they were recording, so these effects were heard upon playback. At Sigma Sound, however, the engineers applied zero effects when recording, applying these during the mixing stage instead. As a result, Bowie was initially confounded when hearing the tapes back, as according to biographer Chris O'Leary, he "hadn't heard his 'naked' voice on tape in years."

"Take It in Right", now retitled "Can You Hear Me?", was one of the first songs recorded for the album, on 13August. The sessions moved rapidly, only taking two weeks to complete. It was agreed early on to record as much of the album as possible live, with the full band playing together, including Bowie's vocals, as a single continuous take for each song. According to Visconti, the album contains "about 85% 'live' David Bowie". During this time, Bowie's cocaine addiction heightened at a rapid pace, and as a result, he stayed up day and night recording while the band slept. According to Pegg, an anonymous musician recalled Bowie "waiting several hours for coke to be delivered from New York and he wouldn't perform until it came." His cocaine use affected his voice, creating what Bowie himself called "a real raspy sound" that prevented him from singing higher notes. Bowie himself believed the album contained the highest notes he ever sang on record.

The sessions at Sigma Sound were very productive, resulting in numerous outtakes, including "After Today", "Who Can I Be Now?", "It's Gonna Be Me", a rerecording of "John, I'm Only Dancing" (titled "John, I'm Only Dancing (Again)"), "Lazer", "Shilling the Rubes", a scrapped rerecording of Bruce Springsteen's "It's Hard to Be a Saint in the City" and "Too Fat Polka". Upon Bowie's return to Philadelphia during the second half of the Diamond Dogs tour (referred to as the Soul tour) in November 1974, he and Visconti used the opportunity to add overdubs and start mixing. The recording attracted the attention of local fans, who began to wait outside the studio over the span of the sessions. Bowie built up a rapport with these fans, whom he came to refer to as the "Sigma Kids". On the final day of tracking, the Sigma Kids were invited into the studio to listen to rough versions of the new songs. The album was recorded under several working titles, including Dancin, Somebody Up There Likes Me, One Damned Song (a quote from the title track), The Gouster, Shilling the Rubes and Fascination. An early acetate of The Gouster provided by Visconti showed "John, I'm Only Dancing (Again)", "Who Can I Be Now?" and "It's Gonna Be Me" in the track-listing.

New York sessions

Following the conclusion of the Soul tour in December, Bowie, Visconti and Alomar regrouped at the Record Plant in New York City to record two new songs, "Fascination" and "Win". At this point, Bowie told Disc the title would be Fascination (named after the newly recorded track); "John, I'm Only Dancing (Again)" was still in the track-listing but the two new tracks replaced "Who Can I Be Now?" and "Somebody Up There Likes Me". Visconti, who believed the album was completely finished, returned to London to begin mixing, while Bowie remained in New York, working on separate mixing with in-house engineer Harry Maslin.

During this time, former Beatle John Lennon was working at the Record Plant on his 1975 covers album Rock 'n' Roll. Lennon, who was in his famous "Lost weekend" period, had previously met Bowie in Los Angeles at a party hosted by actress Elizabeth Taylor in September 1974. The two connected and decided to record together. With Alomar, the two convened at Electric Lady Studios in New York in January 1975 and recorded "Fame" and a cover of Lennon's Beatles song "Across the Universe". In Visconti's absence, the session was co-produced by Bowie and Maslin. Alongside Alomar, Bowie invited guitarist Earl Slick and drummer Dennis Davis, making their debuts on a Bowie record, as well as bassist Emir Ksasan from the Soul tour band. Newcomers were percussionist Ralph MacDonald and backing vocalists Jean Fineberg and Jean Millington.

Mixing for Young Americans was completed at the Record Plant on 12January 1975. Bowie contacted Visconti about the collaborations with Lennon two weeks later. According to Pegg, Bowie was apologetic and asked if two tracks could be replaced by "Across the Universe" and "Fame"; the tracks replaced were "Who Can I Be Now?" and "It's Gonna Be Me". Commenting about the replacement, Visconti said: "Beautiful songs and it made me sick when he decided not to use them. I think it was the personal content of the songs which he was a bit reluctant to release, although it was so obscure I don't think even I knew what he was on about in them!"

Songs
Young Americans presented a new musical direction for Bowie. Although songs on Diamond Dogs, including "Rock 'n' Roll with Me" and "1984", exhibited a funk and soul direction, Stephen Thomas Erlewine of AllMusic wrote that the blue-eyed soul showcased on Young Americans "came as a shock". Along with blue-eyed soul, the music has been described as R&B and Philadelphia soul, while Bowie himself labeled the sound of the album as "plastic soul", describing it as "the squashed remains of ethnic music as it survives in the age of Muzak rock, written and sung by a white limey". Ashley Naftule of Consequence of Sound described the album as "a blue-eyed soul album that plays matchmaker between Bowie's artsy rocker tendencies and the warm earnestness of soul and R&B." Biographer Christopher Sandford writes that the album is "a record of high spirits and lively, colliding ideas". Biographer Marc Spitz felt that the album doesn't showcase "Bowie does black music", but rather "Bowie and black music do each other".

Side one
The opening track is the title track, which Bowie said was "just [about] young Americans", more specifically "a newly-wed couple who don't know if they really like each other. Well, they do, but they don't know if they do or don't." The song also presents new lyrical directions for the artist: instead of "shady" characters living in worlds fraught with darkness, "Young Americans" shows typical American teenagers. References are made to the Watergate scandal and McCarthyism, while the line "I heard the news today, oh boy" is from the Beatles' song "A Day in the Life", acknowledging Lennon's influence on Bowie and their imminent collaboration later on in the album. Author Peter Doggett writes that the song introduced the world to an entirely new Bowie, catching everyone by surprise. Bowie wrote "Win" about people who "don't work very hard". According to author James Perone, the lyrics are more abstract than the previous track and thus are open to interpretation. Saxophones and strings feature throughout, while the backing vocalists are more relaxed and in line with Bowie's lead. O'Leary cites "Win" as the track on Young Americans that mostly foreshadows Bowie's direction on his next album Station to Station (1976). Buckley calls the track the album's standout and "one of the most gorgeous melodies Bowie has ever written."

"Fascination" evolved out of a Vandross track titled "Funky Music (Is a Part of Me)", which Bowie added new lyrics to. Bowie kept most of Vandross' structure but changed the interplay of the backing vocalists. Doggett cites elements in the novels City of Night (1963) and The Occult Reich (1974) as inspirations for the title, while Buckley writes that it reaffirms the 'strange fascination' motif of Bowie's 1971 track "Changes". "Right" is the only track on Young Americans to feature Bowie's old friend Geoff MacCormack. The call and response between Bowie and the backing singers "lends an air of immaculate sophistication to the lyric's paean to positive thinking", according to Pegg. In 1975, Bowie called the song a mantra: "People forget what the sound of Man's instinct is—it's a drone, a mantra. And people say, 'Why are so many things popular that just drone on and on?' But that's the point really. It reaches a particular vibration, not necessarily a musical level." Perone states that the track is a "classic example" of a "groove piece". Bowie, Vandross, Clark and Cherry are seen rehearsing the song in the BBC documentary Cracked Actor.

Side two

Originally developed from "I Am Divine", the title of "Somebody Up There Likes Me" was taken from the 1956 film of the same name starring Paul Newman. Similar to "Right", it uses a call-and-response structure and is embellished in strings, saxophone and synthesisers which hide its rather dark lyrics. Pegg states that the lyrics discuss the idea of celebrity and the "hollowness of fame and adulation". Bowie himself described the song as a "Watch out mate, Hitler's on your back" warning. Buckley finds the lyrics inauthentic as a soul song, comparing them to his 1969 track "Cygnet Committee". Bowie's rendition of "Across the Universe" is a blue-eyed soul reworking that features Lennon on guitar and backing vocals. Bowie had previously called the Beatles' original version "very watery" and wanted to "hammer the hell out of it". His cover has been maligned by critics and biographers, and is often considered as one of Bowie's low points in what Pegg calls his "golden years". Perone finds that as a "groove piece", the cover succeeds.

After Lulu's version of "Take It in Right" failed to come to fruition, Bowie rerecorded it under the title "Can You Hear Me?". O'Leary describes it as contemporary R&B, while Doggett believes its style is more reminiscent of southern music rather than Philly soul. Pegg praises Visconti's string arrangement as one of the album's highlights, further noting that it foreshadows the "majestic ballad style" of Station to Station. Perone likens Bowie's vocal performance to singer Al Green. In 1975, Bowie stated that the song was "written for somebody" but declined to disclose who; his biographers agree that it was most likely for Cherry.

"Fame" was co-written by Bowie, Alomar and Lennon. The lyrics represent Bowie and Lennon's dissatisfaction with the troubles of fame and stardom. Alomar originally developed the guitar riff for Bowie's cover of "Footstompin'" by the Flairs, which Bowie then used to create "Fame". Lennon's voice is heard interjecting the falsetto "Fame" throughout the song. Sources differ as to the extent of Lennon's contributions. Although Doggett argues that Lennon only made the "briefest lyrical contributions", Bowie would later say that Lennon was the "energy" and the "inspiration" for "Fame", and that's why he received a co-writing credit. Lennon would later contradict this story in a 1980 interview where he said: "We took some Stevie Wonder middle eight and did it backwards, you know, and we made a record out of it!"

Outtakes
"Who Can I Be Now?" reflects the theme of self-identity. Over its runtime, it builds to a what Pegg calls a "gospel-choir climax". O'Leary writes that Bowie would revisit a similar theme of Gnostic teachings on "Station to Station". Doggett writes that its title summarises Bowie's career up to this point, sharing a similar theme as "Changes". "It's Gonna Be Me" is a ballad similar in style to Aretha Franklin. Originally titled "Come Back My Baby", it is lyrically similar to "Can You Hear Me?", in that it follows a casual seducer who realises the error of his ways and works to redeem himself. Biographers have generally praised the track as one of the most overlooked gems of Bowie's entire career. "John, I'm Only Dancing (Again)" is a radical seven-minute funk and disco reworking of Bowie's 1972 glam rock single "John, I'm Only Dancing". Although it mostly retains the original song's chorus, Bowie wrote new verses and an entirely different melody. Biographers have generally praised Bowie's vocal performance. It was released as a single in 1979.

Release and promotion
For the album cover artwork, Bowie initially wanted to commission Norman Rockwell to create a painting but retracted the offer when he heard that Rockwell would need at least six months to do the job. According to Pegg, another rejected idea was a full-length portrait of Bowie in a "flying suit" and white scarf, standing in front of an American flag and raising a glass. The final cover photo, a back-lit and airbrushed photo of Bowie, was taken in Los Angeles on 30August 1974 by photographer Eric Stephen Jacobs. Using that photo, Craig DeCamps designed the final cover at RCA Records' New York City office. Sandford calls it one of the "classic" album covers.

After recording much of the album's material in August 1974, Bowie was eager to perform his new work live. Embarking on the second half of the Diamond Dogs tour, lasting 2September to 1December 1974, this portion has been given the nickname the Soul Tour, due to the influence of the new material. Because of this, the shows were heavily altered, no longer featuring elaborate set-pieces, partly due to Bowie's exhaustion with the design and wanting to explore the new sound he was creating. Songs from the previous leg were dropped, while new ones, including some from the new album, were added. During this time, a documentary was filmed that depicts Bowie on the Diamond Dogs tour in Los Angeles, using a mixture of sequences filmed in limousines, hotels and concert footage, most of which was taken from a show at the Los Angeles Universal Amphitheatre on 2September. Directed by Alan Yentob and broadcast on BBC1 in the UK on 26January 1975, Cracked Actor is notable for being a primary source of footage of the Diamond Dogs tour, while also showing Bowie's decaying mental state during this period due to his increasing cocaine addiction. Although Cracked Actor has never received an official release, Pegg calls it "arguably the finest documentary made about David Bowie". After seeing an advanced screening of the film, director Nicolas Roeg immediately contacted Bowie to discuss a role in The Man Who Fell to Earth (1976).

On 29October 1974, Bowie appeared on The Dick Cavett Show and performed "1984", "Young Americans" and a version of "Footstompin'". During his interview, he was visibly drugged, barely being able to talk and nose sniffing constantly. RCA later released the title track as the lead single on 21February 1975, backed by the Ziggy Stardust track "Suffragette City". In the US, it was released in edited form, with a length of 3:11, omitting two verses and a chorus. It managed to reach number 18 on the UK Singles Chart while it charted at number 28 on the Billboard Hot 100, his second top 40 entry and second-highest chart peak in the US up to that point.

RCA rush-released Young Americans on 7March 1975, with the catalogue number RS 1006. It reached number nine on the US Billboard Top LPs & Tape chart and remained on the chart for 51 weeks. It stayed on the UK Albums Chart for 17 weeks, peaking at number two, being kept off the top spot by Tom Jones's 20 Greatest Hits. However, sales were overall lower than Diamond Dogs according to Buckley. The second single "Fame" was released on 25July, with album track "Right" as the B-side. Although it only reached number 17 in the UK, "Fame" topped the charts in the US. Its chart success was a surprise to Bowie, who recalled in 1990: "Even though [Lennon] had contributed to it and everything, and I had no idea, as with 'Let's Dance', that that was what a commercial single is. I haven't got a clue when it comes to singles. I just don't know about them, I don't get it, and 'Fame' was really out of left-field for me." He appeared on ABC TV's Soul Train in early November 1975, where he gave a mimed performance of "Fame" and his most recent single "Golden Years"; he was one of the first white artists to appear on the programme. He then sang "Fame" and "Can You Hear Me?" live on CBS's The Cher Show on 23November.

Critical reception
Young Americans was released to a generally favorable reception, particularly in America. Billboard wrote that the album "should not only endear Bowie even more to his current fans but should open up an entirely new avenue of fans for him", and selected it among their "Top Album Picks" for the week of 15 March 1975. It was further described by Record World as his "most compelling album to date", while Cashbox called the artist "the brightest star in the pop music constellation with this latest RCA release". Amongst mixed reviews, some enjoyed certain tracks but disregarded the collection as a whole. Rolling Stones Jon Landau praised the title-track and thought that "the rest of the album works best when Bowie combines his renewed interest in soul with his knowledge of English pop, rather than opting entirely for one or the other." Record Mirror described the sound as "spasmodic, awkward, frustrating" and having "a joyless energy".

Several critics were negative. Reviewing for The Village Voice, Robert Christgau described the record "an almost total failure" and said "although the amalgam of rock and Philly soul is so thin it's interesting, it overwhelms David's voice, which is even thinner." He nonetheless appreciated Bowie's renewed "generosity of spirit to risk failure" following Diamond Dogs and David Live, which Christgau had found disappointing. Writing for Phonograph Record, John Mendelsohn felt the album was overall very weak, finding the melodies "as good as non-existent", and further criticising the lyrics and Bowie's vocal performance. In the NME, Ian MacDonald felt the record was more of a transitional one, created out of a confused state of mind not knowing where to take his career next. In the end, he enjoyed it despite its flaws. In Melody Maker, Michael Watts praised the backing band, the title track and "Fame", but found the record too "pastiche" to be credible and Bowie's worst release up to that point.

Influence and legacy

Retrospectively, Young Americans continues to receive mixed reviews from critics and fans. Erlewine felt the album was affected by a lack of strong songwriting. Although he praised the title track and "Fame", he concludes "Young Americans is more enjoyable as a stylistic adventure than as a substantive record." Douglas Wolk regarded it as "distinctly a transitional record" in Pitchfork, stating: "It doesn't have the mad theatrical scope of Diamond Dogs or the formal audacity of Station to Station; at times, it comes off as an artist trying very hard to demonstrate how unpredictable he is." Wolk also praised the fact that "while there had already been a handful of disco hits on the pop charts, no other established rock musician had yet tried to do anything similar." Ultimate Classic Rocks Jeff Giles gave the album a positive review, saying "it remains a beloved bright spot in a discography with more than its share".

As a whole, Perone finds that Young Americans lacks the musical cohesiveness of its predecessors and Station to Station, while some of the tracks, including "Across the Universe", "Can You Hear Me" and "Fame", act better as standalone tracks. He commends the record's musical accessibility and concludes: "[The album] would better balance [Bowie's] fascination of more exotic characters with his observations about more widely universal characters better than any of his pre-Young Americans albums." Buckley considers Young Americans to be one of Bowie's most influential records and writes that it brought fans of both glam rock and soul together in the wake of the disco era. Pegg similarly states that "By jumping on the Stax/George McCrae bandwagon" with the album, "Bowie had undertaken the first significant excursion into Black Soul by a mainstream white artist," and paved the way for other artists to engage in similar styles. Sandford adds that while many British rockers have tried and failed to experiment with black musical styles, Bowie was one of the first to succeed. In the UK, artists who would follow in Bowie's footsteps were Elton John (with his single "Philadelphia Freedom"), Roxy Music (with their single "Love Is the Drug") and Rod Stewart (with his album Atlantic Crossing). Pegg writes that Bowie's foray into soul and funk would influence numerous bands in ensuing years, including Talking Heads, Spandau Ballet, Japan and ABC.

Spitz writes that Young Americans was also Bowie's first album in three years to not feature Ziggy Stardust, but Bowie himself. By not featuring Ziggy, Bowie showcased maturity, which Sandford believes was his ticket into the US market. Indeed, the album turned Bowie from "a mildly unsavoury cult artist to a chat-show friendly showbiz personality" in the US. Biographer Paul Trynka states that although the album as a whole is inconsistent, it restored Bowie's momentum after David Live, and the "impressionist working methods" used in its making would "underpin Bowie's career through the rest of the decade". In 2016, Joe Lynch of Billboard argued that "Fame" and Young Americans as a whole served as an influence not only on other funk artists (naming George Clinton and Parliament-Funkadelic's song "Give Up the Funk (Tear the Roof off the Sucker)"), but also early hip hop artists and the West Coast G-funk genre of the early 1990s.

Bowie himself expressed mixed statements about Young Americans throughout his lifetime. In late 1975 he described it as "the phoniest R&B I've ever heard. If I ever would have got my hands on that record when I was growing up I would have cracked it over my knee." He would further voice his dislike for the record and describe it as "a phase" in a 1976 interview with Melody Maker. Bowie would later reverse his stance in the 1990s, speaking to Q magazine in 1990: "I shouldn't have been quite so hard on myself, because looking back it was pretty good white, blue-eyed soul."

Despite the overall mixed reception, Young Americans was voted Bowie's ninth best album in a 2013 readers' poll for Rolling Stone. The magazine argued that its style shift helped introduce Bowie to a wider audience. That same year, NME ranked the album at number 175 in its list of the 500 Greatest Albums of All Time. The album was also included in the 2018 edition of Robert Dimery's book 1001 Albums You Must Hear Before You Die.

Reissues
The album was originally released on CD by RCA in 1984, and then by Rykodisc/EMI in 1991, with three bonus tracks. This reissue charted at number 54 on the UK Albums Chart for one week in April 1991. A 1999 rerelease by EMI featured 24-bit digitally remastered sound and no extra tracks. The 2007 reissue, marketed as a "Special Edition," included an accompanying DVD, containing 5.1 surround sound mixes of the album and video footage from The Dick Cavett Show. In 2016, the album was remastered for the Who Can I Be Now? (1974–1976) box set, which also includes an earlier, rawer-sounding draft of the album, titled The Gouster. It was released in CD, vinyl, and digital formats, both as part of this compilation and separately.

The 1991 and 2007 reissues featured, as bonus tracks, "Who Can I Be Now?", "John, I'm Only Dancing (Again)", and "It's Gonna Be Me"; the latter was released in an alternate version with strings on the 2007 edition. The 1991 reissue replaced the original versions of "Win", "Fascination" and "Right" with alternate mixes, but later reissues restored the original mixes. Another outtake, "After Today", appeared on the 1989 box set Sound + Vision, as did the alternate mix of "Fascination".

Track listing

Personnel
According to the liner notes and biographer Nicholas Pegg.
David Bowie – vocals, guitar, keyboards
Carlos Alomar – guitars
Mike Garson – piano
David Sanborn – saxophone
Willie Weeks – bass guitar 
Andy Newmark – drums 
Earl Slick – guitars

Additional musicians
Larry Washington – congas
Ava Cherry – backing vocals
Robin Clark – backing vocals
Luther Vandross – backing vocals, vocal arrangements
Anthony Hinton – backing vocals
Diane Sumler – backing vocals
Pablo Rosario – percussion 
John Lennon – vocals, guitar, backing vocals 
Emir Ksasan – bass guitar 
Dennis Davis – drums 
Ralph MacDonald – percussion 
Jean Fineberg – backing vocals 
Jean Millington – backing vocals

Charts and certifications

Weekly charts

Year-end charts

Certifications

Notes

References

Sources

External links 
 

1975 albums
Albums produced by David Bowie
Albums produced by Tony Visconti
Albums recorded at Electric Lady Studios
Albums recorded at Sigma Sound Studios
David Bowie albums
EMI Records albums
RCA Records albums
Rykodisc albums
Virgin Records albums
Parlophone albums